Procopio is the title character of an eponymous Italian comic strip series created  by Lino Landolfi.

The comic started in 1951 in the comics magazine Il Vittorioso, where it was published until the close of the magazine in the late sixties.

Procopio debuted as a squire of a medieval knight. The author was later able to make it a polyvalent character, who plays many different roles, with the artifice of a modern Procopio, which tells of the adventures of his ancestors (all called Procopio and all with the same characteristics and traits). 

In a 1958, in an Italian survey conducted by RAI TV, it resulted as the most popular character of the children's literature and comics.

In 1966, Procopio was protagonist of a series of vinyl records titled Le fiabe di mago Procopio; the same year he was subject of a novel, Procopio di Terracupa, written by the same Landolfi.

Procopio also appeared in a short-living series of B&W animated shorts.

References

Italian comic strips
Italian comics characters
1951 comics debuts
1968 comics endings
Humor comics
Historical comics
Fictional Italian people
Fictional swordfighters in comics
Comics characters introduced in 1951
Comics adapted into animated series
Comics adapted into television series